Joseph Hiley (18 August 1902 – 17 November 1989) was a British Conservative Party politician, and a member of the Conservative Monday Club. He was Member of Parliament for Pudsey from 1959 until his retirement at the February 1974 general election.

References

External links 
 

1902 births
1989 deaths
Conservative Party (UK) MPs for English constituencies
UK MPs 1959–1964
UK MPs 1964–1966
UK MPs 1966–1970
UK MPs 1970–1974